Le Chaffaut-St-Jurson is a commune in the Alpes-de-Haute-Provence department in southeastern France.

Geography
The village is located at an altitude of 584 meters, in the valley of the Bléone.

The differents commune adjacent to Le Chauffaut-Saint-Jurson are Aiglun, Digne-les-Bains, Châteauredon, Mézel, Saint-Jeannet, Malijai, Mirabeau, Mallemoisson.

Toponymy

The locality of Chaffaut appeared for the first time in the textes between 1064 and 1079 (in Kadalfucho ). The term comes from the north-occitan translating cadalfac, naming a house with an outside staircase and a balcony according to Ernest Nègre, from catafalicum, meaning scaffold or siege tower according to Bénédicte and Jean-Jacques Fénié.

Saint-Jurson is a deformation of the name of the holy patron saint of the church, saint Georges, apostle of the Velay.

Population

See also
Communes of the Alpes-de-Haute-Provence department

References

Communes of Alpes-de-Haute-Provence
Alpes-de-Haute-Provence communes articles needing translation from French Wikipedia